William Hawley Atwell (June 9, 1869 – December 22, 1961), frequently known as W. H. Atwell, was a United States district judge of the United States District Court for the Northern District of Texas.

Education and career

Born in Sparta, Wisconsin, Atwell received an Artium Baccalaureus degree and Bachelor of Science degree from Southwestern University in 1889, and a Bachelor of Laws from the University of Texas School of Law in 1891. He was in private practice in Dallas, Texas, from 1891 to 1898. He was the United States Attorney for the Northern District of Texas from 1898 to 1913, thereafter returning to private practice in Dallas until 1924. Atwell also served as the first commissioner for the Dallas Zoo, a position he held from 1912 to 1914.

Federal judicial service

On December 30, 1922, Atwell was nominated by President Warren G. Harding to a new seat on the United States District Court for the Northern District of Texas created by 42 Stat. 837. He was confirmed by the United States Senate on January 9, 1923, and received his commission the same day. He served as Chief Judge from 1948 to 1954, assuming senior status on December 31, 1954. Atwell continued to serve in that capacity until his death on December 22, 1961.

References

Sources
 

1869 births
1961 deaths
People from Sparta, Wisconsin
Southwestern University alumni
United States Attorneys for the Northern District of Texas
Judges of the United States District Court for the Northern District of Texas
United States district court judges appointed by Warren G. Harding
20th-century American judges
University of Texas School of Law alumni